Government College for Women Baramulla (Urdu;) commonly known as Women's College Baramulla is a University Grants Commission autonomous college located on a  campus in Baramulla, Jammu and Kashmir. It was founded in the year 1986. The college is affiliated with the University of Kashmir and is recognised by UGC.

It has been awarded grade "B" by the NAAC.

Establishment 
The Govt. of Jammu and Kashmir established the college in the year 1986 during the era of the then chief minister of Jammu and Kashmir Farooq Abdullah.

Location 
Women's College Baramulla is situated on National Highway Road, near tehsil point, Baramulla 54 km north-west of state summer capital Srinagar. It is a premier institution of Higher Learning for women in district Baramulla.

Overview 
Women's College Baramulla was established in the year 1986. The college is affiliated with the University of Kashmir and recognised by UGC under (f) and 12(b) of UGC Act 1956. It was initially housed in Govt. Girls Higher Secondary School Baramulla located adjacent to the present campus area. It started its academic venture with a meager number of students in Arts & Commerce and was later on shifted to its own campus in the year 1995. Science stream was introduced after a gap of 16 years in  2002  and Computer Sciences were introduced in 2005 almost 20 years after the establishment of the college.

Courses offered 
 Bachelor of Arts
 Bachelor of Science (Medical)
 Bachelor of Science (Non Medical)
 Bachelor of Commerce
 Bachelor of Computer Applications
Besides this add on course like Data Care Management, Data Processing Management & Sericulture are offered to students.

References 

Degree colleges in Kashmir Division
Women's universities and colleges in Jammu and Kashmir
University of Kashmir
Educational institutions established in 1986
1986 establishments in Jammu and Kashmir
Colleges affiliated to University of Kashmir